Eric Meyers may refer to:

Eric M. Meyers, biblical scholar and archaeologist
Eric Meyers (actor), American voice actor in Henry's Amazing Animals, I Shouldn't Be Alive and other various works

See also
Eric Myers
Eric Meyer (disambiguation)